Hu Xueyang (born 17 July 1963) is a Chinese film director, producer, writer and actor. Born in a family of dramatists, he graduated from the Beijing Film Academy in 1989. He is a professor and a board member of the China Film Association. He is considered a member of the Chinese Sixth Generation filmmakers.

His brother Sherwood Hu is also a film director.

Biography
Hu was born in July 1963 in Heilongjiang in Northeastern China into a family originally from Shanghai. His graduation work at the Beijing Film Academy, Memories of Childhood (1989), reflects on the protagonist's childhood during the Cultural Revolution.

Film Director

1990s
The film Those Left Behind (1991), screened about a Chinese wife whose husband has left for America. The film's realistic presentation of contemporary Chinese urban life and its subtle revelation of the inner world of the characters.

Hu's next film Drawing (1994), in which he himself played the male lead, portrays a young tennis instructor seduced by the beautiful wife of a rich businessman.

2000s
From 2006, Hu wrote, directed and produced Shanghai 1976 (2006－2008), a Cultural Revolution romance that tells the tale of a forbidden love in Shanghai China in the turbulent year 1976.  Four young people come of age and fall in love against the backdrop of political and historical events.  Their heritage reflects Shanghai's cosmopolitan history.  While the Cultural Revolution unravels around them, these four begin to dream new dreams to reach for freedom and to nurture hope for a brighter future.  The film stars noted French actor Jean-Hugues Anglade, who starred in films such as Betty Blue, plays the role of a priest and father of the two girls in the film.

Filmography

References

External links

 

1963 births
Living people
Beijing Film Academy alumni
Film directors from Heilongjiang